A Light in the Window is a novel written by American author Jan Karon.  It is book two of The Mitford Years series.  The first edition was published in hardcover format by Doubleday in 1994.

List of characters
 Father Tim
 Cynthia Coppersmith
 Edith Mallory
 Dooley Barlowe

External links
 *The Mitford Years official website

1995 American novels
Novels by Jan Karon
Doubleday (publisher) books
Novels set in North Carolina